Shri M.D. Shah Mahila College of Arts and Commerce is a college in Malad, Mumbai, Maharashtra, India.

Shri M. D. Shah Mahila College of Arts & Commerce, the largest tributary of 
Janseva Samiti offers the following  educational programs and services  -
Degree Courses - in BA, BCOM, BMS, BCA, BMM, BAFI
Post Graduation Courses – MA in Economics, Hindi, History & M. Com. - Commerce / Marketing 
Career Oriented Programs approved by UGC – in Fashion Designing, Interior Designing, Entrepreneurship & Travel and Tourism
M I PATEL Diploma courses – in Fashion Designing, Interior Designing, Journalism, Home science, Computer, Textile Designing, Beauty Culture, Hair Designing Art & Craft.
Short Term Courses – Personality Development, Beauty Culture, Soft Toy Making, Painting, Candle Making, English Speaking, Cooking, Flower making, Calligraphy & Yoga 
Computer Course for all – 100 hrs in three years
Value Added Course offered by the departments – Brahmi and Kharoshti Script, Training In Swaras, Practical Training In Nursery School 
Enrichment courses - Communication skills, Yoga and meditation, and Course in Life skills
Bridge courses -– Vedic Maths and Statistics
Interdisciplinary courses under UGC Merged Scheme - Coaching for Competitive exams and Enhancing Language Skills (English)
Other courses - MS-CIT, Certificate courses in Retail management and Tally, Journalism, Home science, Art & Craft and Beauty Culture & Hair Designing.

NAAC Grade
The College is Re-accredited by NAAC in 2021 with an "A" Grade in RAF of NAAC - CGPA 3.04 (4th Cycle)

Achievements
The College won the IMC RBNQA PERFORMANCE EXCELLENCE TROPHY 2012 under Education category

The College won the Maharshi Karve Utkrushta Mahavidyalay Puraskar-2014-15 on the Occasion of SNDT Women's University Centennial Year

Awarded at University and District level by Government of Maharashtra in Jagar Janivacha Campaign

Seven time winners of 'Best Educational Quality Enhancement Team Award by NCQM'

External links
 

Colleges in India
Women's universities and colleges in Maharashtra
Universities and colleges in Mumbai
Educational institutions established in 1968
1968 establishments in Maharashtra